Chiara Benati (born 18 July 1956) is an Italian composer. She was born in Bologna, Italy, and studied piano, conducting and composition with Paolo Renosto and Cesare Augusto at the Bologna Conservatory.

After completing her education, Benati took a position teaching harmony and counterpoint at the G.B. Martini Conservatory of Bologna. In 1992, she was chosen as the representative of Italian contemporary music at the Arts Institute of Chicago. Her music has been performed and broadcast internationally.

Works
Selected works include:
Capriccio for guitar
Come Erba Sotto la Terra, song cycle
Idylls, lyrics by Andrea Iezzi for voice and guitar
Voci for flute, violin and piano (1989)
Variazioni su una sequenza di Maderna for harp (1991)
Chthon for flute and percussion (1991)
Ove s'asconde un rivo for flute (1991)
Di lievi rintocchi for guitar and piano (1988)
Trio (in memoria di Luigi Nono) for violin, cello and piano (1991)
Un Agnus Dei sul cantusfirmus di Frye for madrigal choir and orchestra
Canto per Irma for Soprano voice and string orchestra

Her music has been recorded and issued on CD, including:
Chiara BenatiPAN 3063

References

1956 births
Living people
20th-century classical composers
Italian music educators
Women classical composers
Italian classical composers
Musicians from Bologna
School of the Art Institute of Chicago alumni
20th-century Italian composers
Conservatorio Giovanni Battista Martini alumni
Women music educators
20th-century women composers